Madison Township is one of twelve townships in Jay County, Indiana, United States. As of the 2010 census, its population was 656 and it contained 268 housing units.

Madison Township was established in 1835.

Geography
The streams of Mad Run, Madison Creek, Speed Run and Walnut Creek run through this township.

Cities and towns
 Salamonia

Unincorporated towns
 Salem

References
 U.S. Board on Geographic Names (GNIS)
 United States Census Bureau cartographic boundary files

External links
 Indiana Township Association
 United Township Association of Indiana

Townships in Jay County, Indiana
Townships in Indiana